Follyfoot is a children's television series co-produced by the majority-partner British television company Yorkshire Television (for transmission on ITV) and the independent West German company TV München (for transmission on the ZDF channel). It aired in the United Kingdom between 1971 and 1973, repeated for two years after that and again in the late 1980s. The series starred Gillian Blake in the lead role. Notable people connected with the series were actors Desmond Llewelyn and Arthur English and directors Jack Cardiff, Stephen Frears, Michael Apted and David Hemmings.

It was originally inspired by Monica Dickens' 1963 novel Cobbler's Dream (republished in 1995 as New Arrival at Follyfoot); she later wrote four further books in conjunction with the series—Follyfoot in 1971, Dora at Follyfoot in 1972, The Horses of Follyfoot in 1975, and Stranger at Follyfoot in 1976.

Background and production 

The series, which was filmed on the Harewood family estate, was set at a home of rest for horses. Despite an apparent appeal limited to young girls with an equine interest, Follyfoot was actually aimed squarely at the teenage market and often had challenging things to say about the treatment of horses and animals generally in British society. The ethos of Follyfoot generally was to give another chance to both horses and people who had been rejected by the rest of society: the stance of the series was recognisably pro-animal, and characters who resembled the archetypes of the Pullein-Thompson sisters et al  were overwhelmingly shown in a negative light. Continuity in the series was assured by the use of mainly one writer, Tony Essex, who wrote 34 of the 39 episodes.

The series' theme song, "The Lightning Tree", written by Francis Essex, the brother of Tony Essex and sung by The Settlers, is well-remembered, sometimes more so than the series itself. The song reached No. 36 in the UK charts in 1971. An album featuring music from the series was also released.

The main actors were Gillian Blake as Dora, Steve Hodson as Steve, Christian Rodska as Ron Stryker, Desmond Llewelyn as the Colonel and Arthur English as Slugger. Several other famous people had minor roles: Pam St Clement, Gretchen Franklin as the Colonel's housekeeper and Kathy Staff in two separate bit parts. What really characterised the series was its rotation of directors, many of whom have since become revered figures in the UK film industry, including Stephen Frears, Michael Apted and Jack Cardiff who took time out from working overseas with Kirk Douglas to direct two episodes of the series. Also, in the third series, David Hemmings took the time to appear in one episode, "Uncle Joe" and also to direct two other episodes, which took place before and after that episode: "The Bridge Builder" and the final episode, "Walk In the Wood".

The series proved to be very popular and was sold to many countries at the time of the original UK transmission. The first series won the Harlequin award for best production at the 1972 BAFTA Awards, while the second series episode, "The Debt", reached the top 20 in the weekly television ratings—a rarity for an afternoon-timeslot show. During production for the third series, it was intended that this would be the last, a film version of Follyfoot was planned, but the idea was ultimately shelved. The children's magazine Look-in featured a picture-strip of the series each week as well as regular features, while five annuals were released in association with Yorkshire Television. These ran until 1976—long after the series had finished.

Follifoot (note the slightly different spelling) is a small village just three miles from Harrogate, not far from the Yorkshire Television studios in Leeds.

Characters

Main Characters
 Dora Maddocks (Gillian Blake): the series' central character and niece of The Colonel. The daughter of a bigwig ambassador, she has spent a miserable childhood because her parents have never understood her and being showered with material possessions was no compensation. In Series 2 ep 4, she recalls the pain of her 10th birthday where, instead of getting the pony she wanted, she instead got the most expensive dresses available. The story begins when Dora is sent to live with the Colonel when her parents leave for a government commission in South America—when she discovers Follyfoot farm, Dora finds her idyll. Dora is an idealist and a dreamer; she cannot cope with change and tries to shut out the fact the world is full of bad people. When the Colonel signs Follyfoot over to her, Dora desperately tries to keep the farm running as it always has done, despite this becoming increasingly impractical and the resulting tension with her love interest, Steve. Her disillusionment with the elite world she was brought up in is redolent of Monica Dickens's own feelings in the 1930s (she had been a debutante, but abandoned that privileged life to go into domestic service).
 Steve Ross (Steve Hodson): Miner's son and former reform school pupil who served time in prison for lashing out at a man he found whipping a horse. A very competent horseman, he comes to work at Follyfoot after his previous employer, the Squire, refuses to believe he wasn't involved in an attack on his horses. Steve believes in the same values as Dora but through life experiences has a more realistic view of the world and this causes increasing tension with Dora throughout the second and especially the third series. He has an emotional attachment with Dora and wishes he could be more idealist like her.
 Ron Stryker (Christian Rodska): the third of the trio of young workers at Follyfoot but also the shadiest. He is known to the police and one of his friends is Lewis Hammond, member of local miscreant gang the Night Riders. His father persuaded the Colonel to give him a job at Follyfoot to help keep him out of trouble, yet Ron is workshy and ignores constant warnings not to burst through the main gate at Follyfoot with his distinctive Triumph Tiger motorbike. Despite the rough exterior, Ron is essentially warm-hearted and loves the horses as much as everyone else. Ron is already working at Follyfoot when Dora, then Steve, arrive.
 Slugger Jones (Arthur English): ex-boxer and "housekeeper" at Follyfoot Farm who has been working for the Colonel for over 20 years. He proves to be an emotional rock for Dora but will readily tell her to "snap out of it" where necessary. Slugger is gruff yet cuddly at the same time and is rather fond of Ron despite their love-hate façade. His cookery is notorious for its lack of variety—bacon and eggs or stew!
 Colonel Geoffrey Maddocks (Desmond Llewelyn): Dora's uncle and the original owner of Follyfoot farm. He started Follyfoot years ago as his response to all the cruelty in the world and his attempt to do something about it. The Colonel has a reputation as a kindly eccentric and is the first person most people call on when they've got a horse in need of rehoming. He thinks the world of Dora and proves to be more of a father to her than her actual father, but an illness weakens him in Series 2 and when he signs Follyfoot over to Dora, she must increasingly have to manage under her own steam. He comes over, broadly, as a One Nation Tory, very much of the centre ground.

Minor Characters
 Lewis Hammond (Paul Guess): known locally as "The Louse", Ron's friend and leader of motorcycle thugs the Night Riders. He is complicit in the death of two of the Squire's horses, which leads to Steve being wrongly implicated and sacked.
 Callie Holmes (Gillian Bailey): teenage schoolgirl who occasionally helps out at Follyfoot. In the episode Moonstone, Callie coerces Steve into helping her hide a horse she's stolen from the circus, believing the animal to be unhappy. Steve is naturally twitchy because of his criminal past. Callie has a crush on Steve.
 Gip Willens (Bryan Sweeney): young boy who loves horses but has little idea how to look after them. After Ron spins him a line about Follyfoot being a place where horses are tortured, Steve has his work cut out trying to convince him otherwise and it takes the near-death of Gip's horse to win him round.
 Wendy Bendiger (Elaine Donnelly): a brief love-interest for Steve, which causes much upset for Dora. She eventually breaks up with him, which Steve puts down to their class difference.
 Sam Lockwood (Frederick Treves): unscrupulous horse trader who is in it only for the money and does not care whether his animals are going to good homes. He proves the main series villain in Series 3, with Follyfoot having to take in two of his animals. His son Chip (Nigel Crewe) briefly dates Dora but he is too loyal to his father for the relationship to progress.
 Hazel Donnelly (Veronica Quilligan): 14-year-old reform school delinquent sent to Follyfoot by the probation service. Dora takes an initial dislike to her, especially when she almost attacks her favourite horse Copper and forms a bond with Steve, but Hazel is essentially a younger version of Dora with the same background and strained relationship with her parents. After a volatile start she takes to working at Follyfoot and it is widely thought among the show's fans Hazel would have become a regular character had the series continued.
 Another recurring (but very minor) character is the Vet (unnamed), played by Geoffrey Morris, who appears in several episodes during series 2 and 3. A second vet, played by Colin Rix, appeared in the first and last episodes of series 1 and in both cases was seen putting a sick horse out of its misery.

Episodes

Series overview

Series 1 (1971)

Series 2 (1972)

Series 3 (1973)

Home releases

The first three episodes were released on video in 1995. No further releases ever came to light, and this video has long been deleted.

However, on DVD, Series 1 (episodes 1 to 13) was released in 2007. Series 2 was released on DVD in April 2008, with Series 3 following in October 2008. The DVDs are Region 2 encoded, and in PAL format. A complete boxset of the series was released in late 2008.

References

External links
The Follyfoot Tribute Fan Site
The Follyfoot forum

Follyfoot: Horses And High Production Values by Sabrina Ferguson 

Television series by Yorkshire Television
1970s British children's television series
1971 British television series debuts
1973 British television series endings
ITV children's television shows
British teen drama television series
Television series by ITV Studios
Television shows set in Yorkshire
English-language television shows
Television series about horses
1970s British drama television series